Helena Frith Powell is an author and a columnist.

Frith Powell was born in Sweden to a Swedish mother and an Italian father. She studied at Durham University, where she wrote for Palatinate and also served on the Fashion Show committee. She writes the 'French Mistress' column in The Sunday Times about living in France and has also contributed to Tatler and Harper's.

She has written books, including:
 Ciao Bella: In Search of My Italian Father was written when she moved to France, where she lived with her family for five years.
Two Lipsticks and a Lover (2007) is about the secrets behind French style and taste.  Two Lipsticks and a Lover has been bought by Penguin in the US and Arrow in the UK for paperback publication. The book is published in America as All You Need to Be Impossibly French.
More More France Please continues to explore what it is like to live in France.
Love in a Warm Climate: A Novel About the French Art of Love  was published by Gibson Square in March 2011.

References

External links
Helena Frith Powell
The Sunday Times review of Ciao Bella l Two lipsticks]
Ciao Bella: In Search of My Italian Father  on Amazon
More More France Please on Amazon
http://www.telegraph.co.uk/culture/books/3657051/Truffle-pasta-like-nonna-used-to-make-it.html Daily Telegraph Review of Ciao Bella

British columnists
British journalists
Swedish emigrants to the United Kingdom
Swedish people of Italian descent
Year of birth missing (living people)
Living people
Alumni of St Mary's College, Durham
British people of Italian descent